Life Party may refer to:
 Life Party (Republic of the Congo)
 Liberal Party (Japan), formerly known as the Life Party